Tellurogallates are chemical compounds which contain anionic units of tellurium connected to gallium. They can be considered as gallates where tellurium substitutes for oxygen. Similar compounds include the thiogallates, selenogallates, telluroaluminates, telluroindates and thiostannates. They are in the category of chalcogenotrielates or more broadly tellurometallates or chalcogenometallates.

Formation 
Tellurogallates may be produced by heating a metal with gallium and tellurium in a sealed tube.

Properties 
Some tellurogallates are semiconductors

Use 
Tellurogallates are primarily of research interest. They are investigated for their infrared, thermoelectric and semiconductor characteristics.

List

References 

Gallium compounds
Tellurium compounds